Shawn Desman is the self-titled debut studio album by Canadian singer Shawn Desman. The album debuted at number 38 in Canada and spawned three singles: "Get Ready", "Shook" and "Spread My Wings". It was also certified gold by Music Canada for selling over 50,000 units in that country.

Track listing

 (*) Denotes co-producer.

Charts

Certifications

References

2002 debut albums
Shawn Desman albums
Sony BMG albums